University of Maryland Baltimore Washington Medical Center (UM BWMC) is a hospital in Glen Burnie, Maryland that is part of the University of Maryland Medical System (UMMS). This hospital opened as North Arundel Hospital in 1965 with three floors and limited acute care services.  In 2000, North Arundel Hospital joined into UMMS and in 2005, the name was changed to UM Baltimore Washington Medical Center to reflect the hospital's growth in size and greater regionality from expanded services.

UM BWMC currently consists of:
 The original hospital building containing general medicine and surgical services
 Emergency Department
 Diabetes Center
 Tate Cancer Center
 Aiello Breast Center
 Maryland Vascular Center
 Joint Replacement Center
 Spine and Neuroscience Center
 Wound Healing Center

Awards and recognition
In 2006, Solucient, a firm that measures performance for healthcare centers, named BWMC one of America's Top 100 Hospitals in the Large Community Hospital category.  BWMC was the only hospital in Maryland and Washington, D.C. to earn the award.

References

External links
 Baltimore Washington Medical Center website
 Baltimore Washington Medical Center on Google Street View

University System of Maryland
Hospital buildings completed in 1965
Glen Burnie, Maryland
Hospitals in Maryland